Star Channel is a Greek free-to-air television channel that broadcasts a mix of foreign and Greek shows. It was launched in December 1993 and is owned by  New Television S.A.  (a company owned by Giannis Vardinogiannis).

Star Channel is known in Greece mostly for its programming style, both in terms of live shows and news content, with an increased focus on lifestyle, showbiz, gossip, and fashion news, and on "comedic" presentation.

In 2013, Star started combining information with entertainment, resulting in the channel's shift to a more serious tone. Star Channel generated €64 million in net profit in 2014 which represents a 32.2% increase from the previous year.

History
Star Channel was launched on 4 December 1993 to compete with Mega, ANT1, Alpha TV and ERT Channels. It began broadcasting children's programs as well as foreign series. In 1994 – Star Channel began to exchange family/children's programs from Alpha, then known as Skai (Greek spelling of Sky) with Star's children's programming. Star Channel made its international debut in 2005, joining the UBI World TV platform, which made Star available to viewers in Australia as well as in Asia and Africa. UBI World TV launched in New Zealand in 2008 making Star International available there.

In March 2011, Star Channel began showing some of its programs in 16:9 – mostly television series and films – and as of April, it switched to 16:9 for all its programming, including its own shows and news broadcasts.

In March 2016, Star Channel started its pilot broadcast of STAR HD (1080i) through Digea in Attica and Central Macedonia on 27 February 2016.

Programming
Star Channel airs 24/7 news, shows and reality shows, foreign series and many movies with premieres. The network also airs a seven-hour weekend morning animation block called "Starland" (formerly as Star Toons).

Current programs

Game shows
Wheel of Fortune Greece
Shopping Star

Soap operas
Tria Milia (Three Miles)

Talk shows
Alithies me ti Zina (Truths with Zina)
Breakfast At Star

Former shows on Star Daytime

Soap operas
O antras ton oneiron mou (2017–2018)
Arena (2017)
9 mines (2015–2017)
Orkos Siopis (2014–2015)

Game shows
Blind Taste (2015–2017)
Oi Klironoi (2004)
Monomahos (2002–2004)

Talk shows / Variety shows
Sti Folia ton Kou Kou (2017–2021)
Just Cooking (2015)
Mia (2014–2015)
Live U (2013–2017)
Meletise to (2013–2014)
Stin Kouzina me ti Dina (2012)
Mila (2011–2014)
Made in Star (2011–2012)
Axizei na to zeis (2010–2011)
FM Live (2009–2016)
Nistikoi Praktores (2009–2012)
Parea me ton Andrea (2009)
Proini/Mesimeriani Meleti (2008–2013)
O kairos me tin Petroula (2008–2010)
Kilise o tentzeris (2008–2009)
Yparhei Logos (2008–2009)
Boro (2007–2009)
Mesa s' ola (2007–2008)
Ti tha fame simera (2006–2008)
La Sousourela (2006–2008)
Ola Kala (2005–2006)
Ole (2004–2005)
Kathe Mera Kalimera (2003–2009)
Exo Thema (2003–2004)
Super Star (2002–2011)
Star Magazino (2002–2003)
Me tin Elda (2002)
Logia Starata (2001–2004)
Mera me ti mera (2001–2002)
I ygeia xtizetai kathe mera (2000–2002)
Malvina Rixten (1999–2000)
Ta Mystika tis Agapis (1998–2000)
Star Cafe (1997–2000)
Mia nea arhi (1997–1998)
Gefsi Zois (1996–1997)
Pes to sti Semina (1995–1996)

Star International
Star International was launched in November 2005 and airs the "best of" Star Channel programming to Greeks in the Asia Pacific region, Africa and North America.

Star International is currently available to viewers in Australia, New Zealand, South Africa and Asia through TV Plus; it operates on a 24-hour schedule.

In October 2009, Star International officially launched in North America, available exclusively on RCN Cable in the United States but in June 2010, RCN Cable dropped the channel due to the low number of subscriptions.

In May 2011, Star International re-launched in the US and was made available via satellite on the Home2US platform. In late 2012, Home2US ceased operations. The channel is currently available in North America through IPTV provider Ellas TV.

On 23 September 2014, Star International launched in Canada via Bell Fibe TV.

On 10 December 2020, Star International launched on Bell Satellite TV, making the channel available across Canada.

External links

Television networks in Greece
Greek-language television stations
Television channels and stations established in 1993
1993 establishments in Greece
Television channels in Greece